Maison Trimbach (F. E. Trimbach) is a winery located in Ribeauvillé, Alsace, France. Trimbach produces many of its high-end wines from its own vineyards, but also operates a négociant business which buys grapes to produce additional wines. The company is especially noted for its high-end dry Riesling wines produced in a traditional Alsace wine style.

History 

The company was founded in Riquewihr in 1626 by Jean Trimbach from Sainte Marie aux Mines. In the 1840s, the winery was moved to Hunawihr, and just after World War I it was moved to Ribeauvillé.

Wines 
The most famous of the wines is the Clos Ste Hune, a dry Riesling produced from a special plot inside the Rosacker Grand Cru vineyard.

References

External links 
 
Trimbach profiled by The Wine Doctor

Wineries of France
Alsace wine
1639 establishments in France